Ford is a civil parish in Shropshire, England.  It contains 21 listed buildings that are recorded in the National Heritage List for England.  Of these, two are at Grade II*, the middle of the three grades, and the others are at Grade II, the lowest grade.  The parish contains the village of Ford and the surrounding countryside.  The listed buildings are two country houses and associated structures, smaller houses, a church and a sundial in the churchyard, a public house, a milestone, and a war memorial.


Key

Buildings

References

Citations

Sources

Lists of buildings and structures in Shropshire